= Women and Environments International Magazine =

Women and Environments International Newsletter
- Publisher: B. Peterson
- First issue: 1976
- Final issue: 2017
- Country: Canada
- Based in: Downsview, Ontario
- Language: English
- ISSN: 0229-4796

Women and Environments International Magazine (WEI) is a Canadian feminist periodical publishing in Toronto, Ontario. Established in 1976, the magazine was founded by David Morley, Rebecca Peterson and Gerda Werkele of the Faculty of Environmental Studies at York University. Its content primarily focuses on women's relationships with their environments. WEI was originally a newsletter under the name Women and Environments International Newsletter. Now mainly run by volunteers dedicated to social change, it is one of the longest running environmental feminist magazines in Canada.
